The Association of Exempt Firemen Building is located in Hoboken, Hudson County, New Jersey, United States. The building was designed by Francis G. Himpler and was built in 1870. The building was added to the National Register of Historic Places on March 30, 1984 as Assembly of Exempt Firemen Building. The building serves as a firefighters' union hall and as a museum of Hoboken firefighters' memorabilia, the Hoboken Fire Department Museum.

See also
National Register of Historic Places listings in Hudson County, New Jersey
Exhibitions in Hudson County

References

External links
 Hoboken Fire Department
 Article about the museum

Buildings and structures in Hudson County, New Jersey
Fire stations completed in 1870
Defunct fire stations in New Jersey
Firefighting museums in the United States
Museums in Hudson County, New Jersey
Fire stations on the National Register of Historic Places in New Jersey
Buildings and structures in Hoboken, New Jersey
National Register of Historic Places in Hudson County, New Jersey
New Jersey Register of Historic Places